Allen is an unincorporated community in the town of Clear Creek in Eau Claire County, Wisconsin, United States. It lies almost exactly midway between Cleghorn and Foster, at the southern junction of Eau Claire County Highways "D" and "V".

The community was named after one of its early settlers, Charles Allen, on whose property the community was built, in approximately 1870. In 1913, the Fairchild and North-Eastern Railway was extended to Cleghorn via Allen.

Notes

External links
History of the Allen School District

Allen
Unincorporated communities in Wisconsin